The 1983 Centennial Cup is the 13th Junior "A" 1983 ice hockey National Championship for the Canadian Junior A Hockey League.

The Centennial Cup was competed for by the winners of the Abbott Cup/Western Canadian Champions and the Eastern Canadian Jr. A  Champions.

The finals were hosted by the North York Rangers in the city of North York, Ontario.

The Playoffs

Prior to the Regionals
Abbotsford Flyers (BCJHL) defeated the Williams Lake Mustangs (PCJHL) 2-games-to-none
North York Rangers (OPJHL) defeated Elliot Lake Vikings (NOJHL) 3-games-to-2
Thunder Bay Kings (TBHL) defeated Ottawa Senators (CJHL) 4-games-to-3
Dauphin Kings (MJHL) defeated The Pas Huskies (NMJHL) 3-games-to-none

MCC Finals

Regional Championships
Manitoba Centennial Cup: North York Rangers

Abbott Cup: Abbotsford Flyers
Eastern Champions: North York Rangers

Doyle Cup: Abbotsford Flyers
Anavet Cup: Dauphin Kings
Dudley Hewitt Cup: North York Rangers
Callaghan Cup: Halifax Lions

Roll of League Champions
AJHL: Calgary Canucks
BCJHL: Abbotsford Flyers
CJHL: Ottawa Senators
IJHL: Sherwood-Parkdale Metros
MJHL: Dauphin Kings
MVJHL: Halifax Lions
NBJHL: Moncton Hawks (League defaulted from National Jr. A play)
NMJHL: The Pas Huskies
NOJHL: Elliot Lake Vikings
OJHL: North York Rangers
PCJHL: Williams Lake Mustangs
SJHL: Yorkton Terriers

Awards
Most Valuable Player: Dennis McCarroll (North York Rangers)
Most Sportsmanlike Player: Don McLaughlin (North York Rangers)

See also
Canadian Junior A Hockey League
Royal Bank Cup
Anavet Cup
Doyle Cup
Dudley Hewitt Cup
Fred Page Cup
Abbott Cup
Mowat Cup

External links
Royal Bank Cup Website

1983
Cup